Frederic White Cook (May 2, 1873November 16, 1951) was an American politician who served as the Massachusetts Secretary of the Commonwealth from 1921 to 1949. As of 2021 he is the last Republican to ever serve in that office.

Early life
Cook was born in Somerville, Massachusetts on May 2, 1873 to Sanford Reuben Cook and his wife Harriet Frances (Dassance) Cook.

Cook attended the Somerville public schools.

Family life
On December 19, 1905, Cook married Kathleen Russell, of Brooklyn, New York.  They stayed married until her death in Somerville, Massachusetts on April 30, 1947.

Early career
Cook started out as the assistant clerk of committees, for the city of Somerville.  On January 25, 1901, Cook was appointed to the newly created position of Assistant City Clerk of Somerville at a Salary of $1400 a Year.

In 1905 Cook Became the City Clerk of Somerville.

Massachusetts Secretary of the Commonwealth
In 1920 Cook was elected to be the Massachusetts Secretary of the Commonwealth, a position he would hold for a record 28 years.

Death
Cook died November 16, 1951.

References

Politicians from Somerville, Massachusetts
Secretaries of the Commonwealth of Massachusetts
1873 births
1951 deaths
Massachusetts Republicans